Dames Ferry is an unincorporated community in Monroe County, in the U.S. state of Georgia.

History
A post office called Dames Ferry was established in 1884, and remained in operation until 1958. The community was named after John and George Dame, proprietors of a nearby ferry on the Ocmulgee River. A variant name was "Ebenezer".

References

Unincorporated communities in Monroe County, Georgia